117 Squadron or 117th Squadron may refer to:

 117 Squadron (Israel)
 No. 117 Squadron RCAF, Canada
 No. 117 Squadron RAF, United Kingdom
 117th Air Control Squadron, United States Air Force
 117th Air Refueling Squadron, United States Air Force
 VAW-117, United States Navy
 VPB-117, United States Navy